Kostenets is a town in Sofia Province in southwestern Bulgaria, and the administrative centre of the Kostenets Municipality (which also contains a separate village of Kostenets).

The average monthly and annual air temperature at daylight varies from -4.2C (January) to +16.1C (July). The abundance of mineral springs is one of the special characteristics of the region. The spa resort of Momin Prohod is a specialised centre for rehabilitation and recreation and attracts many visitors. The spa resorts Villas Kostenets, Pchelinski bani, and the village of Kostenets are near the town.

The favourable climatic factors, the unique combination of the thermal mineral water resources with the immediate proximity to the resort of Borovets and the country's capital, and the natural and historical sights provide a potential for all-the-year-round tourism, recreation and sport.

Kostenets Saddle in Imeon Range on Smith Island in the South Shetland Islands, Antarctica is named after Kostenets.

Notes

Populated places in Sofia Province
Spa towns in Bulgaria
Towns in Bulgaria